The 2011 Hall of Fame Tennis Championships (also known as the Campbell's Hall of Fame Tennis Championships for sponsorship reasons) was a tennis tournament played on outdoor grass courts. It was the 36th edition of the Hall of Fame Tennis Championships, and was part of the ATP World Tour 250 series of the 2011 ATP World Tour. It took place at the International Tennis Hall of Fame in Newport, Rhode Island, United States, from July 4 through July 10, 2011.

Finals

Singles

 John Isner defeated  Olivier Rochus, 6–3, 7–6(8–6) 
It was Isner's 1st title of the year and 2nd of his career.

Doubles

 Matthew Ebden /  Ryan Harrison defeated  Johan Brunström /  Adil Shamasdin, 4–6, 6–3, [10–5]

Singles main draw entrants

Seeds

Seedings are based on the rankings of June 21, 2011.

Other entrants
The following players received wildcards into the singles main draw:
  Tommy Haas
  John Isner
  Denis Kudla

The following players received entry from the qualifying draw:

  Richard Bloomfield
  Alex Bogdanovic
  Jimmy Wang
  Michael Yani

References

External links
 

Hall of Fame Tennis Championships
2011